The Rabbit Is Me is an East German dramatic film directed by Kurt Maetzig.

Plot
Nineteen-year-old Maria Morzeck dreams of studying Slavistics, but her hopes are shattered when her brother, Dieter, is sent to prison after being convicted of sedition against the state. She cannot enter college, and becomes a waitress. Maria meets and falls in love with Paul Deister, an older, married man who turns out to be the judge who convicted her brother. Their affair ends when Deister is exposed as hypocritical and corrupt. After Dieter's release, he learns of his sister's relationship with the judge and assaults her. Eventually, Maria distances herself from both of them, and decides to pursue her forgotten dream.

Cast

Production
The film was based on Manfred Bieler's book Maria Morzeck or the Rabbit is Me. It was made in the aftermath of the VI Party Congress of the Socialist Unity Party at January 1963, during which the establishment allowed a measure of liberalization in the cultural life of East Germany. Although Bieler's novel was highly critical of the court system, he and Maetzig took care to include several "alibi scenes" in the film that were intended to put the state in a better light and also prevent the banning of the picture. The scenes were also meant to present the judicial reforms that took place between 1961 and 1963.

Reception
The short era of liberalization ended gradually when Leonid Brezhnev took power in the Soviet Union and introduced a conservative, more repressive course on cultural questions. The film, alongside eleven other cinematic works that were deemed politically damaging, was banned by the Central Committee of the SED at its XI Plenum in December 1965. It was only made legal again in 1990. The banned films were known as "cellar films" or "rabbit films" - the second sobriquet having been derived from the film's title.

At 1990, shortly before the collapse of the Eastern Bloc, the picture was released for public screening, and presented in the Berlin and Locarno film festivals. In 1995 it was elected as one of the 100 most important German films by a group of historians and critics.

Daniela Berghahn noted that The Rabbit Is Me was unprecedented in its portrayal of judicial corruption, sexual themes and criticism of the East German establishment.

References

Bibliography

External links
 
 original 1965 poster on ostfilm.de.

1965 films
East German films
1960s German-language films
Films set in Berlin
Films directed by Kurt Maetzig
1965 drama films
German black-and-white films
Films based on German novels